Fish Dam Run is a  long second-order tributary to West Branch Susquehanna River.  This is the only stream of this name in the United States.

Course

Watershed

See also 
 List of Rivers of Pennsylvania

References

Rivers of Pennsylvania
Tributaries of the West Branch Susquehanna River
Rivers of Clinton County, Pennsylvania